Sistina may refer to:
 Sistina (name), a feminin italian given name
 Sistina (surname), a very rare italian surname
 Sistina (typeface), an all-capitals serif typeface
 Sistina Software, a U.S. company that focused on storage solutions designed around a Linux platform, acquired by Red Hat in 2003
 Sistine Chapel (Cappella Sistina in Italian)